Sanaria is a biotechnology company developing vaccines protective against malaria and other infectious diseases as well as related products for use in malaria research. Sanaria's vaccines are based on the use of the sporozoite (SPZ) stage of the malaria parasite, Plasmodium, as an immunogen, and as a platform technology for liver-vectored gene delivery. SPZ are normally introduced into humans by mosquito bite where they migrate to the liver and further develop to liver stages, and eventually back into the blood stream where the parasite infects red blood cells (RBC) and causes malaria. Plasmodium falciparum is the species responsible for more than 95% deaths caused by malaria. The WHO estimates there were 241 million clinical cases and 627,000 deaths in 2020 alone.

Sanaria has developed the technology to grow and harvest aseptic, purified Plasmodium falciparum (Pf) SPZ and formulate them as vaccines for human use. Sanaria's first generation vaccine is called Sanaria® PfSPZ Vaccine, and uses radiation attenuated (weakened) SPZ, that cannot divide or cause disease, to induce these protective immune responses in the liver. The next generation vaccines are attenuated differently. Sanaria® PfSPZ-CVac, uses infectious PfSPZ administered along with antimalarial drugs to develop through the liver stage and be killed before infecting RBCs and induce protective immunity. Sanaria®  PfSPZ-LARC2 Vaccine is genetically attenuated to arrest (halt development) late in the liver stages of the life cycle. Sanaria is also developing a vaccine that will prevent malaria caused by Plasmodium vivax, the second most important type of malaria parasite worldwide and is expanding its PfSPZ platform to develop vaccines for other diseases where an immune response in the liver may be beneficial, such as chronic hepatitis.

In addition to vaccines,Sanaria produces PfSPZ products for clinical research. Sanaria® PfSPZ Challenge consists of purified, aseptic, infectious PfSPZ and is used for controlled human malaria infections to assess the efficacy of vaccines and drugs against malaria, and acquired or induced immunity and resistance to malaria infection.

Mission statement
Sanaria's primary mission is to develop and commercialize whole-parasite PfSPZ vaccines that confer high-level, long-lasting protection against Plasmodium falciparum, the malaria parasite responsible for more than 95% of malaria-associated severe illness and death worldwide and the malaria parasite for which there is the most significant drug resistance. The overall mission includes 1) developing vaccines that prevent all human malaria and using these vaccines to immunize entire populations in geographically defined areas to halt malaria transmission and thereby eliminate malaria and 2) developing vaccines for prevention or treatment of other infectious diseases, and diseases of the liver.

History
Sanaria moved into its first facility in Rockville, MD in July 2003 supported by a phase I Small Business Innovation Research (SBIR) grant from the National Institute of Allergy and Infectious Diseases (NIAID) of the National Institutes of Health (NIH) and subsequently by a $4.09M grant from the United States Army Medical Research Acquisition Activity Group to further develop its vaccine.  In 2007, Sanaria received a $29.3-million grant from the Bill and Melinda Gates Foundation (BMGF), administered through the PATH Malaria Vaccine Initiative (MVI) which supported the construction of Sanaria's manufacturing facility in Rockville, MD. In 2009, Sanaria received approval from the FDA to test PfSPZ Vaccine in human trials. Sanaria® PfSPZ Vaccine is highly protective against Pf malaria transmitted by controlled human malaria infection (CHMI) and naturally transmitted malaria.  PfSPZ Vaccine received FDA Fast Track Designation in 2016. Sanaria's second generation baccine,PfSPZ-CVac (CQ) has shown even stronger protection against CHMI at a much lower dose than PfSPZ Vaccine. Sanaria® PfSPZ-LARC2 Vaccine, developed most recently, has been manufactured and is expected to be assessed in clinical trials in 2022 and 2023.

Clinical Trials
Twenty-two clinical trials of PfSPZ Vaccine(radiation-attenuated SPZ) have been completed or are being conducted in Tanzania, Kenya, Mali, Burkina Faso, Gabon, Equatorial Guinea, Germany, the Netherlands, Indonesia, and the U.S.. Recent results from a study in women of child-bearing potential in Mali showed significant vaccine efficacy (VE) against both malaria infection and clinical malaria over 18 months ranging from 40 to 85%.  Many of the women participating in the trial became pregnant during follow-up post immunization and VE during pregnancy against malaria infection was 49-57%. Based on these results, a new clinical trial will be initiated in 2023 in pregnant Malian women who will be immunized in the second or third trimesters to see if PfSPZ Vaccine is safe during pregnancy and will reduce the maternal and fetal morbidity and mortality associated with pregnancy malaria. This study will be conducted by the Malaria Research and Training Center, University of Bamako, and the Laboratory of Malaria Immunology and Vaccinology, NIAID, with Sanaria sponsorship. A second trial in 6–10-year-old Malian children was initiated in 2022 by the same collaborators.

Eleven clinical trials of PfSPZ-CVac (chemo-attenuated SPZ) have been or are being conducted in the Netherlands, the U.S., Germany, Equatorial Guinea, Mali, and Indonesia. In a 2021 article in Nature, two Phase I clinical trials of PfSPZ-CVac were highlighted for efficacy against a malaria parasite variant, including 100% protection at three months after immunization, marking by far the best protection ever achieved in the history of malaria vaccine development.

A vaccinethat relies on targeted genetic alteration (gene deletion). arrests early during the liver stage.  This vaccine, called Sanaria®  PfSPZ-GA1 was assessed in its first clinical trial in the Netherlands. While this vaccine was safe, it did not offer any advantages over PfSPZ Vaccine, and is not being pursued further. Sanaria is now preparing for first-in-human clinical trials of PfSPZ-LARC2 Vaccine, a late-arresting, replication-competent genetically altered parasite with improved antigen expression compared to PfSPZ-GA1. PfSPZ-LARC2 vaccine is predicted to equal PfSPZ-CVac (chloroquine) in potency and have the same excellent safety profile as PfSPZ Vaccine. This new generation genetically altered parasite is being developed in collaboration with the Seattle Children's Research Institute.

An important Sanaria product is non-attenuated sporozoites, called Sanaria®  PfSPZ Challenge. This is the immunogen used in PfSPZ-CVac and can be used to infect research participants with P. falciparum malaria to test the efficacy of vaccines and drugs (called controlled human malaria infection, or CHMI) and the impact of innate and acquired immunity and genetic background on malaria.  The fully infectious sporozoites of PfSPZ Challenge have enabled research teams worldwide to conduct CHMI studies, including in the U.S., the Netherlands, Germany, United Kingdom, Spain, Tanzania, Kenya, Mali, Gabon, Equatorial Guinea, and the Gambia. Sanaria has two variants of PfSPZ Challenge, one from West Africa and one from Brazil, and plans to develop additional variants in the coming years.

I-PfSPZ-C
Sanaria's research and development is conducted with the collaboration of the International PfSPZ Consortium (I-PfSPZ-C), a group of ~240 investigators and funders from 70 organizations in 26 countries who are dedicated to development of whole PfSPZ malaria vaccines that can be used to prevent malaria in individuals and systematically eliminate malaria from geographically defined areas of the world. The I-PfSPZ-C meets 1-2 times each year to present data, discuss ideas, and map out plans for future studies in an open forum.

Funding 
In addition to  U.S. NIAID, U.S. DoD, and the BMGF, significant funding for development of PfSPZ vaccines has come from the Government of Equatorial Guinea and the corporate social responsibility arms of three U.S. energy companies (Marathon Oil, Noble Energy and AMPCO), Top Institute Pharma (the Netherlands), universities in Nijmegen and Leiden, the Netherlands, the University of Tübingen, the German Centre for Infection Research (DZIF), the Swiss Tropical Public Health Institute and the Swiss Government, and the Tanzanian Commission on Science and Technology.

In 2020, Sanaria Inc. received €12.9M from the European Union Malaria Fund (EUMF) for the development of two malaria vaccines, one malaria prophylactic, and a SARS-CoV-2 vaccine.

Awards
2020 Highly Commended Prophylactic Vaccine, 13th Annual Vaccine Industry Excellence Awards
2020 USPTO Patents for Humanity Award
2019 P3 Impact Award Winner, Concordia Summit
2015 Montgomery County Bioscience Company of the Year at the 3rd Annual Montgomery County Small Business Awards
2014 Best Prophylactic Vaccine – World Vaccine Congress, Vaccine Industry Excellence Awards
2013 Emerging Business of the Year – Montgomery County Chamber of Commerce
2012 Commercialization Award – Maryland Biotech Center
2011 Biotechnology Firm of the Year – Tech Council of Maryland
2010 Ranked 15th in The Gazette of Politics and Business Exceptional 53 Business Award
2009 Best Early-Stage Vaccine Biotech – World Vaccine Congress Washington, Vaccine Industry Excellence Awards
2009 Ranked 22nd in The Gazette of Politics and Business Exceptional 53 Business Award
2008 Emerging Company of the Year – Tech Council of Maryland Tech Awards

References

External links 
 Company website

Biotechnology companies of the United States
Companies established in 2003